is a major highway on the island and prefecture of Hokkaido in northern Japan. The  highway begins at an intersection with National Routes 279 and 278 in Hakodate. It travels north across the southern half of the island, traveling through Otaru where it curves to the east toward its endpoint at an intersection with National Route 12 in Chūō-ku, Sapporo.

Route description

Overlapping sections
In Oshamanbe, from Kunnui intersection to Asahihama intersection: Route 230
From Kutchan (North-4 West-1 intersection) to Kyōwa (Kunitomi intersection): Route 276
From Yoichi (Yoichi Station intersection) to Otaru (Inaho 2-18 intersection): Route 229

Municipalities passed through
Oshima Subprefecture
Hakodate - Nanae - Mori - Yakumo - Oshamanbe
Shiribeshi Subprefecture
Kuromatsunai - Rankoshi - Niseko - Kyōwa - Niki - Yoichi - Otaru
Ishikari Subprefecture
Sapporo

History
Capron was an American advisor to the Hokkaido Development Commission who was paid to assist in the development of Sapporo as a planned city. The Sapporo Hondō connected Sapporo to Hakodate at the southern end of the Hokkaido where sea connections to the main island of Japan, Honshu, were located. The Sapporo Hondō was completed in 1877.

On 4 December 1952, the Cabinet of Japan designated the Sapporo Hondō as First Class National Highway 5. On 1 April 1965, it was reclassified as National Route 5.

Gallery

Major junctions
The route lies entirely within Hokkaido.

See also

References

External links

005
Roads in Hokkaido